Michel Rusheshangoga (born 25 August 1994) is a Rwandan international footballer who plays for As Kigali, as a defender.

Career
Rusheshangoga has played for Kigali-based clubs Isonga and APR.

He made his senior international debut for Rwanda on 1 December 2012 in and against Eritrea (0–2), where he played the entire match, and has appeared in FIFA World Cup qualifying matches.

References

External links
 

1994 births
Living people
Rwandan footballers
Rwanda international footballers
Isonga F.C. players
APR F.C. players
Association football defenders
2016 African Nations Championship players
Rwanda A' international footballers